Nick Hoheisel is an American politician serving as a member of the Kansas House of Representatives from the 97th district. Elected in November 2018, he assumed office in 2019. Hoheisel is a native of Wichita, Kansas.

References

External links 
Nick Hoheisel Vote Smart

Living people
Year of birth missing (living people)
Republican Party members of the Kansas House of Representatives
People from Wichita, Kansas